Augustus Richard Beeby (24 January 1889 – 1974), sometimes known as Dick Beeby, was an English professional footballer who played as a goalkeeper in the Football League for Liverpool and Manchester City.

Personal life 
Beeby served as a gunner in the Royal Garrison Artillery during the First World War.

Career statistics

References

External links
 Augustus Beeby at lfchistory.net
 Augustus Beeby at liverpoolfc.com

1889 births
English footballers
Liverpool F.C. players
Manchester City F.C. players
Tranmere Rovers F.C. players
Association football goalkeepers
1974 deaths
People from Ashbourne, Derbyshire
Footballers from Derbyshire
English Football League players
British Army personnel of World War I
Royal Garrison Artillery soldiers
Military personnel from Derbyshire